Ianeti is a village in the Ozurgeti Municipality of Guria in western Georgia. It is located along the Supsa River. As of 2014, it has a population of 236.

References

Populated places in Ozurgeti Municipality